Wolvercote Cemetery is a cemetery in the parish of Wolvercote and district of Cutteslowe in Oxford, England. Its main entrance is on Banbury Road and it has a side entrance in Five Mile Drive. It has a funeral chapel, public toilets and a small amount of car parking. It was awarded plaques as a category winner of 'Cemetery of the Year' in 1999 and 2001.

The cemetery was opened in 1889 and now contains more than 15,000 burials. Along with the other Oxford public cemeteries it was expected to be full before 2021.

Sections
The cemetery has a number of sections for individual religions or ethnicities, including Baháʼí, Muslim, Jewish (first section dedicated 1894; extension 2000), Greek Orthodox, Russian Orthodox, Serbian Orthodox, Polish Roman Catholic and other Roman Catholic (the section in which the Tolkiens are buried) and Quakers.

There is an area for the burial of cremated remains, one for green burials and another for the burial of stillborns and infants.

Notable internments

Many notable people are buried in Wolvercote Cemetery, including many former academics of the University of Oxford.

 Charles Umpherston Aitchison (1832–1896), Lieutenant Governor of the Punjab
 Michael Argyle (1925–2002), social psychologist, and his wife Sonia
 Sir Roger Bannister (1929–2018), middle-distance runner and neurologist who ran the first sub-4-minute mile
 Sir Ernest Bennett (1865–1947), Oxford fellow, politician, explorer and writer
 Sir Isaiah Berlin (1909–1997), Latvian-born philosopher, and his wife Aline
 Benjamin Henry Blackwell (1849–1924), bookseller
 E. J. Bowen (1898–1980), chemist
 Włodzimierz Brus (1921–2007), economist, with his wife Lieutenant-Colonel Helena Wolińska-Brus (1919–2008), military prosecutor at show trials in Stalinist Poland in the 1950s
 John Burdon-Sanderson (1828–1905), physiologist
 Humphrey Carpenter (1946–2005), biographer and writer
 Jaroslav Černý (1898–1970), Czech Egyptologist
 Sir Thomas Chapman, 7th Baronet (1846–1919) and Sarah Junner (1861–1959), with inscriptions to the memory of their sons Frank, Will and T. E. Lawrence
 Robert Bellamy Clifton (1836–1921), physicist
 L. Jonathan Cohen (1923–2006), philosopher
 Frank Cooper (1844–1927) and his wife Sarah Cooper (1848–1932), marmalade manufacturers
 T. Lawrence Dale (1884–1959), architect and Oxford Diocesan Surveyor
 John Louis Emil Dreyer (1852–1926), Danish-born astronomer
 Edward Gordon Duff (1861–1924), bibliographer
 Sir Michael Dummett (1925–2011), philosopher
 Elizabeth Edmondson (1948–2016), author
 Bill Ferrar (1893–1990), mathematician
 Grace Eleanor Hadow (1875–1940), promoter of women's higher education
 H. L. A. Hart (1907–1992), legal philosopher and professor of jurisprudence
 Sir Thomas Erskine Holland (1835–1926), professor of international law
 Albert Hourani (1915–1993), scholar of Middle Eastern history
 Elizabeth Jennings (1926–2001), poet
 Sir Francis Knowles, 5th Baronet (1886–1953), anthropologist
 Adam Koc (1891–1969), politician, colonel and journalist of the Second Polish Republic
 Peter Laslett (1915–2001), social historian
 James Legge (1815–1897), Scottish sinologist and first Professor of Chinese at the University of Oxford
 Eleanor Constance Lodge (1869–1936), historian and promoter of women's higher education
 Paul Maas (1880–1964), Classical and Byzantine scholar
 Michael Francis Madelin (1931–2007), mycologist
 James McCann (1897–1983), Archbishop of Armagh and Primate of All Ireland
 Sir Henry Christopher Mance (1840–1926), electrical engineer, developer of the heliograph
 Bruce Mitchell (1920–2010), Australian scholar of Old English
 James Murray (1837–1915), Scottish lexicographer and philologist, primary editor of the Oxford English Dictionary
 Dimitri Obolensky (1918–2001), Russian prince and professor of Russian and Balkan history
 Daphne Park (1921–2010), spy
 Professor David Patterson (1922–2005), Hebraist
 William Henry Perkin Jr. (1860–1929), organic chemist
 Sir William Schlich (1840–1925), forester
 James Allen Shuffrey(1858–1939), Victorian and Edwardian watercolour artist
 Franz Baermann Steiner (1909–1952), ethnologist
 John Stokes (1915–1990), Principal of Queen's College, Hong Kong
 P. F. Strawson (1919–2006), philosopher
 J. R. R. Tolkien ("Beren", 1892–1973), author and academic, with his wife Edith ("Lúthien", 1889–1971) and eldest son John Francis Reuel Tolkien (1917–2003)
 Dino Toso (1969–2008), automotive engineer
 Brian Tovey (1926–2015), head of GCHQ
 Francis Fortescue Urquhart (1868–1934), first Roman Catholic fellow of Balliol College in modern times
 Mike Woodin (1965–2004), Green Party politician
 E. M. Wright (1906–2005), mathematician

War graves
The cemetery includes the war graves of 44 Commonwealth service personnel: 21 from World War I and 23 from World War II.

See also
 Holywell Cemetery
 Osney Cemetery
 St Sepulchre's Cemetery

References

External links

 

1889 establishments in England
Buildings and structures completed in 1889
Cemeteries in Oxford
Christianity in Oxford
Commonwealth War Graves Commission cemeteries in England
J. R. R. Tolkien